Roland CUBE is a series of guitar and bass amplifiers manufactured and distributed by the Roland Corporation. The CUBE series use amplifier modeling technology.

Series

Mobile CUBE
A multi-purpose battery-powered portable amplifier featuring 5 watt stereo power and two 4" speakers. It features a microphone channel and instrument channel with tone, delay/reverb and chorus controls.

Micro-CUBE

The Micro Cube is a small battery-powered 2 watt portable amplifier, for use as a portable practice amp or when larger or more expensive amplifiers may not be practical. Features a single 5" speaker.

Micro-CUBE RX
A portable amplifier with four 4" speakers.

Micro-CUBE BASS RX
A portable bass amplifier with four 4" speakers.

CUBE STREET
A 5W battery-powered amplifier featuring two 6.5" speakers. As the name implies, this amplifier is suited for buskers.

CUBE STREET EX
Larger 50W busker battery-powered amplifier featuring two 8" speakers.

CUBE-15
A small 2 channel, 15 watt practice amplifier with a single 8" speaker.

CUBE-20
A 20 watt amplifier with a single 8" speaker.

CUBE-30
A 30 watt amplifier with a single 10" speaker.

CUBE-30 BASS
A 30 watt bass amplifier with a single 10" speaker.

CM-30
A 30 watt multi-purpose portable mixing monitor with a 6.5" speaker.

CUBE-60
A 60 watt amplifier with a single 12" speaker.

CUBE-60 BASS
A 60 watt bass amplifier with a single 12" speaker.

CUBE-80
An 80 watt amplifier with a single 12" speaker.

CUBE-100 BASS
A 100 watt bass amplifier with a single 12" speaker.

Notes

Instrument amplifiers